Mainali (मैनाली) is a Nepalese surname, predominantly Hindu. Mainali are Brahmins and belong to [UPAMANYU, Gotra]. All under Kaundinya (upamanyay) along with Parāshara, Kundina and Vasishtha belong to Vasishta gana. Mainali are Kumain Bahuns.

They are believed to have immigrated to Kanpur-Kavrepalanchok District from the western Himalayan range (at the time, the Himalayan range included Afghanistan, Nepal, and India) Kumaon - therefore referred to as Kumain Bahuns belt and later residing in different parts of Nepal.

The known history of Mainali in Nepal dates back to the era of King Narendra Malla of Kathmandu Valley reigning from 1538 to 1560. Narendra Malla is said to have called Mainali's from Kumaon ( Now India) as the royal priest of temples in Basantapur Durbar ( Now Hanuman Dhoka Durbar Square).

Kul devi of Mainali is said to be Goddess Kalika. The temples in Kanpur, Kavrepalanchowk - the origin place of Mainali's in Nepal has 2 famous and ancient temples of Goddess Kalika which is over 600 years old and said to have divine powers. The temples are said to be sacred and is said to perspire and sweat in times of natural disaster, or during the times of danger to the Mainali clan.

Notable people with the surname Mainali
Guru Prasad Mainali, Nepalese short story writer
Chandra Prakash Mainali, Nepalese politician
Radha Krishna Mainali, Nepalese politician
Padma Kumar Mainali, Joint Secretary, MOUD, Nepal

References

Ethnic groups in Nepal
Bahun
Surnames of Nepalese origin
Nepali-language surnames
Khas surnames